Mary Petherick, also Mary Mummery (1859 – 1946) was a mountaineer and writer, who was the first woman to ascend the Teufelsgrat.

Biography 
Petherick was born in 1859. Her father was J. W. Petherick, who was a solicitor from Exeter. She married Albert F. Mummery in 1883. Both she and her husband were excellent mountaineers, and often climbed together.

In 1887, she, Mummery and Alexander Burgener climbed the Jungfrau, Zinalrothorn, Dreieckhorn, and the Taschorn, and on 15 July made the first ascent of the Teufelsgrat (the Devil's Ridge) in the process. They ended up reaching the peak in a thunderstorm. In the course of the ascent, Petherick took on the role of medical  advisor - bandaging hands and checking for broken ribs. She also had a deep respect for alpine guides, praising Burgener as 'the great man of the party'.

In Mummery's later book, My Climbs in the Alps and the Caucasus, he insisted that Petherick write the chapter on the ascent. In her chapter, she didn't just describe the ascent, but also used the publication as an opportunity to attack the sexism that was rife in mountaineering at the time. She wrote that: 

She died in 1946.

Historiography 
Like many women mountaineers in the nineteenth century, such as Lily Bristow and Margaret Jackson, Petherick's achievements were little recognised at the time. In Petherick's case, despite her husband's support, his achievements overshadowed hers. Indeed, her husband is noted for saying that "All mountains appear doomed to pass through the stages: an inaccessible peak, the hardest climb in the Alps, an easy day for a lady.

Petherick's writing continues to be quoted and her mountaineering achievements are increasingly recognised of significance. Her writing is also recognised for its humour.

References 

1859 births
British women writers
British nature writers
1946 deaths
British mountain climbers
Female climbers